McConville is a surname. Notable people with the surname include:

Bernard McConville (1887–1961), American screenwriter
Bobby McConville (born 1964), Scottish footballer
Brendan McConville (born 1965), American historian
Cameron McConville (born 1974), Australian racing driver
Chloe McConville (born 1987), Australian cyclist
James C. McConville (born 1959), United States Army general
Jean McConville (1934–1972), Irish murder victim
John McConville (died 1849), Irish educator
Joseph-Norbert-Alfred McConville (1839–1912), Canadian lawyer and politician
Josh McConville, Australian actor
Kelly McConville, American statistician
Lewis Arthur McConville (1849–1882), Canadian lawyer and politician
Oisín McConville (born 1975), Irish Gaelic footballer
Paddy McConville (1902 – after 1932), Irish footballer
Peter McConville (born 1958), Australian rules footballer
Sean McConville (born 1989), English footballer
Tommy McConville (born 1947), Irish footballer
Tommy McConville (Australian footballer) (1901–1969), Australian rules footballer